Jennifer Weiss may refer to:

 Jennifer Weiss (politician) (born 1959), American politician
 Jennifer Weiss (producer), Canadian film producer